The 2010 CONCACAF Women's U-20 Championship was the fifth edition of the CONCACAF Women's U-20 Championship. The tournament was hosted by Guatemala, and all matches were played at the Estadio Cementos Progreso. The United States were the defending champions, having won the 2008 tournament, their second regional championship at the under-20 level. The top three sides at the 2010 tournament earned qualification to the 2010 FIFA U-20 Women's World Cup. The tournament was won by the United States, who defeated Mexico in the final, 1–0. Costa Rica secured the final qualification position by defeating Canada in the third place match, 1–0.

Media coverage 

CONCACAF broadcast every game on their official website, concacaf.com, in live stream.  All games were also available in archive. In the United States, Fox Soccer Channel agreed to broadcast two of the group stage matches involving the United States, as well as both the semifinals. Also, Fox Sports en Español broadcast the final.

Qualified teams

Venues

Group stage

Group A

Group B

Knockout rounds

Semifinals

Third place match

Final

Awards

See also 

 2010 FIFA U-20 Women's World Cup

References

External links 
 Official CONCACAF website for Women's Under-20s
 Results (incl. Qualifying) at RSSSF
 CONCACAF Guatemala 2010 Technical Report

CONCACAF Women's U-20 Championship
Women's
2010
CON
2010 in youth association football